Classics Illustrated Junior is a comic book series of seventy-seven fairy and folk tale, myth and legend comic book adaptations created by Albert Lewis Kanter as a spin-off of his flagship comic book line Classics Illustrated.

Publication history
At its peak in 1960, Classics Illustrated Junior'''s average monthly circulation was 262,000.

In 2003, Jack Lake Productions Inc., based in Toronto, Canada began remastering and republishing the entire Classics Illustrated Junior series.

In September of 2008, Classic Comic Store Ltd., based in the UK, under license by Jack Lake Productions Inc. began publishing both the original Gilberton Classics Illustrated regular and Junior lines for distribution in the UK, Republic of Ireland, South Africa, Australia and New Zealand. The issue number sequence is different from the original runs, starting at issue 1 rather than at issue 501. The contents are generally similar to the original run, but the exterior of the back cover is used to advertise future issues, along with details of Classic Comic Store's website. The final page of the issue contains a brief biography of the author(s) of the main story written by William B. Jones, Jr, author of Classics Illustrated: A Cultural HistoryIn common with the first-run series in America, the inside back cover contains an outline picture to colour in from the main story (although the first print run of Issues 1-4 used the American spelling color instead of the British spelling colour).

Complete list of Classics Illustrated Junior comic books (original US run; also 2003-2014 Canadian run)
The Canadian run created by Jack Lake Productions Inc. which began in 2003 followed the same sequence as the original U.S. run.

The authorship is based on the information held by Michigan State University Libraries,
Special Collections Division in their Reading Room Index to the Comic Art Collection, as well as information found on Wikipedia under the title of the individual stories.

List of Classics Illustrated Junior comic books (UK series from 2008)

Up until September 2009 (issue 12), the runs for both the US and the UK runs were identical, albeit with issue numbers starting at 1 for the UK version rather than at 501.

From issue 13 onwards, Classic Comic Store Ltd no longer published the titles (although still publishing the Classics Illustrated line), but imported the issues from Canada (where the series was already being published by Jack Lake Productions Inc.). These issues hence follow the Canadian numbering of the issues (513 onwards).

In October 2012 (when issue 544 had been despatched), Classic Comic Store Ltd no longer continued with a subscription service in the UK, because of the costs involved.

The authorship is based on the information found in the publications themselves, information held by Michigan State University Libraries, Special Collections Division in their Reading Room Index to the Comic Art Collection, as well as information found on Wikipedia under the title of the individual stories.

Note: None of "The Animal World" are credited with a writer, but they are all illustrated by William A. Walsh.

References and notes

Goulart, Ron. Great American Comic Books. Publications International, Ltd., 2001.
Overstreet, Robert M.. Official Overstreet Comic Book Price Guide. House of Collectibles, 2004.

External links
Classics Illustrated Junior Commentary on CIJ adaptations of Aesop's FablesJack Lake Productions Selected Classics Illustrated Junior'' reprints

Comics magazines published in the United States
Fantasy comics
1953 comics debuts
1962 comics endings
Comics based on fiction
Magazines established in 1953
Magazines disestablished in 1962
Defunct American comics